...Y mañana serán mujeres is a 1955 Mexican drama film directed by Alejandro Galindo. It was written by Luis Alcoriza. The film is credited for being one of the earliest films in Mexican cinema to exploit emerging popular music in the 1950s.

Cast
Magda Urvizu
Miguel Arenas
Manuel Arvide
Antonio Bravo
Roberto Cañedo
Alberto Catalá
José Chávez
Jaime Fernández
Sonia Furió
María Gentil Arcos
Maruja Grifell
Sara Guasch
Carmen Ignarra
Dalia Íñiguez
Salvador Lozano Mena
Bruno Márquez

References

External links
 

1955 films
1950s Spanish-language films
1955 drama films
Mexican drama films
Mexican black-and-white films
1950s Mexican films